The 2021 Old Dominion Monarchs football team represented Old Dominion University during the 2021 NCAA Division I FBS football season. The Monarchs played their home games at S.B. Ballard Stadium in Norfolk, Virginia, and competed in the East Division of Conference USA (CUSA). The team were coached by second-year head coach Ricky Rahne.

On October 27, 2021, Old Dominion announced that this would be the last season for the team in the C-USA and become the Sun Belt Conference on July 1, 2022.

Previous season
Due to the COVID-19 pandemic, Old Dominion did not play during the 2020 NCAA Division I FBS football season. The last competitive season the Monarchs played, was in 2019, when they finished the regular season 1–11, 0–8 in CUSA which they placed last (7th place) in the East division. They were not invited to play in any post season bowl game. Bobby Wilder resigned in December 2019, two days after losing to Charlotte.

Schedule
Old Dominion announced its 2021 football schedule on January 27, 2021. The 2021 schedule consisted of 6 home and 6 away games in the regular season.

Game summaries

at Wake Forest

Hampton

at Liberty

Buffalo

at UTEP

at Marshall

Western Kentucky

Louisiana Tech

at FIU

Florida Atlantic

Statistics

at Middle Tennessee

Statistics

Charlotte

Statistics

vs. Tulsa (Myrtle Beach Bowl)

Statistics

References

Old Dominion
Old Dominion Monarchs football seasons
Old Dominion Monarchs football